Adelphailurus is an extinct genus of saber-toothed cats of the family Felidae and tribe Metailurini which inhabited western North America during the Miocene, living from 10.3 to 5.33 Ma and existing for approximately .

Taxonomy
Adelphailurus was named by Hibbard (1934). Its type is Adelphailurus kansensis. It was assigned to Felidae by Hibbard (1934) and Carroll (1988); and to Machairodontinae by Martin (1998).

Morphology
It was a cougar-sized animal and may have had habits similar to those of a cougar. Its body had the same shape as a cougar except for a long and compressed upper canine. This would place this cat into the "false-sabertooth" group. Apart from that Adelphailurus had a retained upper second premolar, which is unusual for a cat.

References

External links

Metailurini
Miocene felids
Miocene mammals of North America
Prehistoric carnivoran genera